Magikal Journey - The Hits Collection 1998-2008 is a compilation album by Dutch electronic dance music producer and DJ Tiësto. The double album was released on 17 May 2010 by Magik Muzik, nine months after Tiësto announced that he had parted ways with Black Hole Recordings, a trance record label he set up with Arny Bink in 1997. Disc one features tracks from Tiësto's three studio albums In My Memory, Just Be and Elements of Life, as well as the two previously unreleased tracks "Magikal Circus" and "Goldrush" (A track that appeared on the PSP game Wipeout Pure). Disc two sees a wide range of artists like Airbase, Laidback Luke, Sander van Doorn, and Bart Claessen on the remix duties for many of Tiësto's successful singles.

Track listing

European edition

US edition

Charts

Weekly charts

Year-end charts

Certifications

Release history

References

2010 compilation albums
Trance compilation albums
Tiësto compilation albums